Birwoodton is a locality situated in the Sunraysia region, in north western Victoria, Australia. The place by road, is situated about 4 kilometres south of Merbein and 14 kilometres northwest of Mildura.

Named after William Birdwood, 1st Baron Birdwood, leader of the ANZAC forces at the Battle of Gallipoli, it was established as an agricultural soldier settler scheme soon after World War I.  The Post Office opened on 19 July 1920 (closed in 1978).

The locality is predominantly devoted to grape production.

Notes and references

External links
Map of Birdwoodton {PDF}

Towns in Victoria (Australia)
Mallee (Victoria)